Cumberland Community School is a coeducational secondary school located in the London Borough of Newham, England. Every year-group consist of 300 pupils with 10 classes of 30 pupils each. It is situated on Oban Close off Prince Regent Lane close to its junction with Newham Way and has substantial land, sharing facilities with neighbouring Newham Leisure Centre. It is built on the site of the former Woodside Community School.

History
The school was first formed in 1972 from the merger of Plaistow County Grammar School and Faraday Secondary Modern School, the school that was then occupying the building that had originally housed Denmark Street Board School.

The school's premises have changed a number of times over recent years, originally a split site school with the lower school on Denmark Street E13, bordered by Cumberland Road E13 to the west and Holborn Road E13 to the north, (now demolished though some of the border walls still exist), and the upper school (that had been Plaistow County Grammar) on Prince Regent Lane E13, on the site of the current Newham Sixth Form College, known as NewVic. It moved to what had been the site of Trinity Boys School on Barking Road, Canning Town E16 which is also now demolished and rebuilt as Rokeby from nearby Stratford.

Cumberland School was designated as a Sports College in 2003. As host of the Cumberland School Sport Partnership (SSP), students are given the opportunity to develop their sporting talents in addition to enhancing their academic achievement. The School was awarded with the FA Charter Standard in 2005, and the school was offered as a training venue for the 2012 Summer Olympics.

Cumberland School was rebuilt in 2003 as part of the UK Government's Building Schools for the Future programme. The new building, with a sports hall, netball courts, two football fields and a triple jump area, was opened by Dame Kelly Holmes in 2006.

In 2007, the school achieved its highest ever results for GCSE Physical Education, with over 200 students achieving a pass. The specialist Sports College results for PE and Sport peaked in 2007 prior to the introduction of the BTEC First Diploma in Sport. In that year there was a growth in numbers of students that completed the British Sport Trust Level 1 Award in Sports Leadership.

in May 2018 Cumberland school converted to academy status. The school is now sponsored by the Community Schools Trust.

Scholarship Programme 

Since September 2019, the school has run a scholarship programme helping very bright pupils win places at top independent schools.

Headteachers
 1972-???? J Angus McDonald
 1994-2009 Jane Noble
 2009–2013 John Bradshaw
 2013-2014 Janet Moore
 2014-2019 Gillian Dineen
 2019–present Omar Deria

References

External links 
 

Secondary schools in the London Borough of Newham
Academies in the London Borough of Newham
1972 establishments in England
Educational institutions established in 1972